Meridian Hall may refer to:

Meridian Hall (Toronto), a performing arts centre in Canada
Meridian Hall (Washington, D.C.), a mansion and historical site in USA
Meridian City Hall, Meridian, Mississippi, USA